Oreichthys andrewi is a small cyprinid fish endemic to the Dibru River in Assam.

References

Fish of India
Oreichthys
Fish described in 2014